Ghadah Al-Samman (born 1942) is a Syrian writer, journalist and novelist born in Damascus in 1942 to a prominent and conservative Damascene family. Her father was Ahmed Al-Samman, a president of the Syrian University.  She is distantly related to poet Nizar Qabbani,  and was deeply influenced by him after her mother died at a very young age.

Career
Her father was fond of both Western literature and Arabic literature; this influenced her deeply and gave her a unique style that combines attributes of both.  Nevertheless, she soon was confronted with the conservative Damascene society in which she was raised. She published her first book of short stories Your Eyes Are My Destiny in 1962, which was received reasonably well.  However, at the time she was lumped in with other traditional feminine writers.  Her later publications took her out of this milieu of feminine and love novels, and into wider social, feminist and philosophical spheres.

She graduated from the Syrian University in 1963 with a BA in English literature, and left to Beirut to earn her master's degree in theatre from the American University of Beirut, after which she did not return to Damascus. In Beirut she worked as a journalist, and in 1965 she published her second collection of stories, No Sea in Beirut, which show the effects of her new, wider experiences. She then traveled around Europe working as a correspondent and in 1966 published her third collection Foreigners’ Nights.

The Six-Day War had a shock effect on her, as it did on many of her generation. This was evident in her famous article "I Carry My Shame to London". After that she did not publish any books for six years. Instead, her journalistic articles became closer to the social reality and made her popular. The articles she wrote during that period became the source of some of her later publications. In 1969 she joined the weekly news magazine of Salim Lawzi, Al Hawadeth, as a correspondent.

In 1973 she published her fourth collection, The Departure of Old Ports, considered by some critics to be one of her most important works.  In this collection of short stories, she described the dilemma of the Arab intellectual and the conflict between his/her thought and actions.  She published her first novel, Beirut 75, at the end of 1974.  The novel describes the complex social problems in Beirut and prophesied the upcoming turmoil a few months before the civil war broke out in Lebanon.

After the publication of two more novels, Beirut Nightmares in 1977, which describes life in civil-war-torn Beirut in the mid-Seventies, and The Eve of Billion in 1986, some critics began referring to her as the most prominent modern Arab writer.

Personal life
In the late 1960s Ghada married Bashir Al Daouq, the owner of Dar Al Tali’a publishing house and had her only son, Hazim, which she named after one of her heroes in “Foreigners' Nights”.  She later made her own publishing house and re-published most of her books, she also gathered all her articles in a series she called “The Unfinished Works”, up to date she has published fifteen books of it, nine of them are poetry collections.  She has stored her unpublished works including many letters in a Swiss bank, which she promises to publish “when the time is right”.

It is believed that some of her letters may reveal some information about some prominent Palestinian writers and poets during the 1960s, of the people her name was linked with are: Nasser Eddin Al-Nashashibi, the journalist and Kamal Nasir, the late poet.

In 1993 she caused a scene in the literary and political arenas when she published a collection of love letters written to her by Ghassan Kanafani in the sixties when she had a love affair with him, which was no secret at the time.  She was condemned for publishing them by some claiming that her intention was to smear the late writer's reputation and/or to negatively affect the Palestinian Cause.

She has also written a few books of literary criticism, and translated some of her works to other languages. Ghada has lived in Paris since the mid-1980s and regularly writes in an Arabic magazine published in London. She now refuses requests for TV interviews after a bad experience when she was interviewed in Cairo, and found out that the interviewer had not read any of her works.

Ghada Al-Samman's mother died when she was young, so she was raised by her father for most of her life. When she was an adult, Samman's father died and she lost her job in a short period of time. She was left alone in the world. People in her society had a traditional frame of mind and saw her as a “fallen woman” (Vinson 4–6). At that time, she had no father or husband to care for and no family to care for her. This is when Samman became a strong advocate for liberty and self-expression for all people, but especially women. She does not shy away from subjects seen by the public as taboo. She questions typical thought about women's sexuality and the freedoms enjoyed by the upper class (Vinson 9–10). Samman has as many critics as she has fans, but she takes the comments in stride and continues to write about beliefs and view points that most writers refuse to touch through her works of fiction. A large part of Ghada Al-Samman's identity is an able, determined woman and she intends to make anyone who will listen feel the same way.

Selected works

Short Stories 
 , 1962
 , 1965
 , 1966
 , 1973
 , 1994

Poetry 
 حب (Hubb), “Love”, 1973.
 أعلنت عليك الحب ('Alanat 'Alayk Hubb), “I Declare Love Upon You”, 1976.

Novels 
 بيروت 75 (Bayrut 75), “Beirut 75”,1974.
 اعتقال لحظة هاربة~I'tikal Lahzah Haribah (Capturing Freedom's Cry), 1979. Translated into English by Rim Zahra, ph.D. & Razzan Zahra, Ph.D. as Capturing Freedom's Cry: Arab Women Unveil Their Heart, 2019.
 الأبديه لحظة حب~ Al-Abadiyya Lahzet Hubb(Eternity is a Moment of Love), 1999. Translated into English by Rim Zahra, Ph.D. as Arab Women in Love and War: Fleeting Eternities, 2009.
 كوابيس بيروت (Kawabis Bayrut), “Beirut Nightmares”, 1977.
 ليلة المليار (Laylat Al Miliyar), “The Eve of Billion”, 1986.
 سهرة تنكرية للموتى (Sahra Tanakuriyah Al Mawta), “A Costume Party for the Dead”, 2003.

Autobiography 

 الرواية المستحيلة: فسيفسا ءدمشقية (Al Ruayah Al Mustahilah: Fasifasa' Dimashqiya), ”The Impossible Novel: Damascene Mosaic”, autobiography, 1997.

References

Sources
Translated from the Arabic Wikipedia.
Non official website of the writer Ghada al-Samman

1942 births
Living people
Syrian Muslims
Syrian journalists
Syrian women journalists
Syrian feminists
Syrian novelists
American University of Beirut alumni
People from Damascus